The Blue Division was a French division during the Franco-Prussian War of 1870.

Commanded by General Élie de Vassoigne, it was made up of two brigades:
The 1st Brigade, commanded by General Reboul, was formed from the 1st Marine Infantry Regiment of Cherbourg and the 4th Marine Infantry Regiment of Toulon; 
The 2nd Brigade, commanded by General Martin des Pallières, comprised the 2nd Marine Infantry Regiment of Brest and the 3rd Marine Infantry Regiment of Rochefort, along with 3 batteries from the 1st Marine Artillery Regiment.

The Blue Division formed part of the 12th Army Corps under the command of Barthélémy Louis Joseph Lebrun, which was the last unit to arrive at Sedan after having made a last attempt to retreat with General de Wimpffen. It fought at Bazeilles on 31 August and 1 September 1870. The town was retaken and abandoned four times, with 2,655 French and 5,200 Bavarians dead, inspiring the patriotic painting Les dernières cartouches (The Last Cartridges) by Alphonse de Neuville. Each year the marines celebrate the anniversary of the battle, ending the ceremonies with the unit's battle cry, "Au nom de Dieu, vive la coloniale" ("In God's name, long live La Coloniale") - the unit had God Himself as its patron saint.

References

External links
 French Marines - official site
 Marines Museum at Fréjus

Military units and formations of the Franco-Prussian War
Divisions of France
Marine corps units and formations